The 1884 United States presidential election in Maryland took place on November 4, 1884, as part of the 1884 United States presidential election. Voters chose eight representatives, or electors to the Electoral College, who voted for president and vice president.

Maryland voted for the Democratic nominee, Grover Cleveland, over the Republican nominee, James G. Blaine. by a margin of 5.98%.

Results

Results by county

Counties that flipped from Democratic to Republican
Calvert

See also
 United States presidential elections in Maryland
 1884 United States presidential election
 1884 United States elections

Notes

References 

Maryland
1884
Presidential